Hercílio Luz Futebol Clube, often abbreviated to Hercílio Luz, is a Brazilian football club based in Tubarão, Santa Catarina. Founded on 22 December 1918, it was the first Santa Catarina club to compete in the Campeonato Brasileiro Série A and the first southern Santa Catarina team to win the state championship. It currently plays in the Campeonato Catarinense Série A, the first division of the Santa Catarina state league.

History
The club was founded on December 23, 1918. They won the Campeonato Catarinense in 1957 and in 1958. Hercílio Luz competed in the Taça Brasil in 1959, but they were eliminated in the first stage by Atlético Paranaense.

Achievements
Campeonato Catarinense: 2
1957, 1958

Stadium
Hercílio Luz Futebol Clube play their home games at Aníbal Costa. The stadium has a maximum capacity of 15,000 people.

References

Association football clubs established in 1918
Football clubs in Santa Catarina (state)
1918 establishments in Brazil